The 1980 Maharashtra State Assembly election was held in July 1980.  A total of 288 seats were contested.

List of participating political parties

Results

The Indian National Congress (Indira) won the majority of seats. Abdul Rehman Antulay became Chief Minister, Sharad Shankar Dighe became Speaker, and Sharad Pawar became leader of the opposition.

!colspan=10|
|- align=center
!style="background-color:#E9E9E9" align=center colspan=2|Political Party
!style="background-color:#E9E9E9" |Candidates
!style="background-color:#E9E9E9" |Seats won
!style="background-color:#E9E9E9" |Seat +/-
!style="background-color:#E9E9E9" |Votes
!style="background-color:#E9E9E9" |Vote %
!style="background-color:#E9E9E9" |Vote % +/-
|-
| 
|align="left"|Indian National Congress (Indira)||286||186|| 124||7,809,533||44.50%|| 26.16%
|-
| 
|align="left"|Indian National Congress (Urs)||192||47|| 22 (from INC seats)||3,596,582||20.49%|| 4.84% (from INC vote share)
|-
| 
|align="left"|Janata Party||111||17|| 82||1,511,042||8.61%|| 19.38%
|-
| 
|align="left"|Bharatiya Janata Party||145||14|| 14||1,645,734||9.38%|| 9.38% (New Party)
|-
| 
|align="left"|Peasants and Workers Party of India||41||9|| 4||726,338||4.14%|| 1.40%
|-
| 
|align="left"|Communist Party of India||17||2|| 1||230,570||1.31%|| 0.17%
|-
| 
|align="left"|Communist Party of India (Marxist)||10||2|| 7||162,651||0.93%|| 0.76%
|-
| 
|align="left"|Republican Party of India (Khobragade)||42||1|| 1||239,286||1.36%|| 0.05%
|-
|
|36
|0
| 2
|132,798
|0.76%
| 0.30%
|-
|
|1
|0
|3
|5,598
|0.03%
|0.79%
|-
| 
|align="left"|Independents||612||10|| 18||1,409,177||8.03%|| 6.03%
|-style="background-color:#E9E9E9"
|
|align="left"|Total||1537||288||||17,548,655||53.30%|| 14.29%
|-
|}

Elected members

References

State Assembly elections in Maharashtra
1980s in Maharashtra
Maharashtra